Faisal Maodah (born 10 November 1990) is a Saudi football player. He currently plays as a left-back.

References

External links
 

1990 births
Living people
Saudi Arabian footballers
Abha Club players
Al-Riyadh SC players
Ettifaq FC players
Al-Ahli Saudi FC players
Najran SC players
Al-Fayha FC players
Al-Nojoom FC players
Al-Hejaz Club players
Saudi First Division League players
Saudi Second Division players
Saudi Professional League players
Association football fullbacks